The Bodil Honorary Award (Honorary Bodil) is one of the special awards at the annual Danish Bodil Awards presented by the Danish Film Critics Association. It was awarded for the first time at the 2nd Bodil Awards in 1949, and pro re nata until 1997, since when it has been awarded annually.

Honorees

1940s 
 1949: Cinematographer Annelise Reenberg for shooting

1950s 
 1951: Former Minister of Finance H. C. Hansen for having lowered taxes on film
 1953: Cinematographer Kjeld Arnholtz for shooting The Crime of Tove Andersen
 1958: Composer Sven Gyldmark for the music to Bundfald
 1959: Charlie Chaplin

1960s 
 1960: Cinematographer  for shooting Paw (1959)
 1961: Actor Dirch Passer because he "with a great talent has let himself be abused by Danish producers, and in the hope that he will soon get a part that will match his talent"
 1964: Cinematographer Henning Kristiansen for shooting  (1963) and School for Suicide (1964)
 1966: Cinema Director  for his excellent way to run the Alexandra Cinema
 1967: Cinema Director Peter Refn for artistic and worthwhile repertoire at the Grand Theatre and the import of quality films
 1968: Cinema Director Ove Brusendorff for the good repertoire in Carlton Cinema
 1969: Cinema Director Peter Refn for importing Satyajit Ray's Indian masterpiece Pather Panchali

1970s 
 1970: Film historian and handbook editor Bjørn Rasmussen for his five-volume encyclopaedia Filmens Hvem Hvad Hvor (The Who What and Where of Films)
 1971: Cinematographer Henning Camre for shooting Giv Gud en chance om søndagen
 1971: Cartoon Directors Flemming Quist Møller and Jannik Hastrup for the animated feature Benny's Bathtub
 1972: Cinematographer Carsten Behrendt-Poulsen for shooting Lenin, You Rascal, You (1972)
 1972: Film Editor Christian Hartkopp for good editing
 1974: Special Effects Designer Henning Bahs for special effects
 1976: Cinematographer Mikael Salomon, lifetime achievement award
 1977: Cinematographer , lifetime achievement award
 1978: Cinematographer Alexander Gruszynski for shooting the documentary  (1977)

1980s 
 1982: Cinematographer Dan Laustsen for shooting  (1981)
 1983: Cinematographer Jan Weincke for shooting Tree of Knowledge (1981) and Zappa (1983)
 1984: Film Importer Jan Vedersø from cinema 'Klaptræet' for quality imports
 1985: Film Producer Per Holst for his excellent work on Kærne Film and import of Wim Wenders' Paris, Texas (1984)
 1986: Set Designer Leif Sylvester Petersen for production design on The Dark Side of the Moon (1986)
 1988: Animation Director Jannik Hastrup, lifetime achievement award for his total production

1990s 
 1992: Film Editor Ghita Beckendorff for her work as editor
 1993: Director Erik Balling, lifetime achievement award because "popular culture and quality are not two contradictory concepts"
 1994: Animation Director Flemming Quist Møller, lifetime achievement award for his many animated films, including Jungledyret Hugo
 1995: Screenwriter , lifetime achievement award for his work as a screenwriter, including The Kingdom
 1997: Actress Bodil Kjer, lifetime achievement award
 1998: Film Composer , lifetime achievement award for his work as a composer
 1999: Actor Ove Sprogøe, lifetime achievement award "for his efforts and long career in the Danish film"

2000s 
 2000: Actress Marguerite Viby, lifetime achievement award
 2001: Film producers Peter Aalbæk Jensen, and Vibeke Windeløv for their and Zentropa's great importance to Danish film development through the 90s
 2002: Film Critic Morten Piil og Film Historian  for their longstanding contribution to Danish film literature
 2003: Screenwriters Kim Fupz Aakeson, Anders Thomas Jensen, and Mogens Rukov, lifetime achievement awards for their screenplays
 2004: Anders Refn, lifetime achievement award for his work as a director, assistant director, editor etc.
 2005: Film Editor , lifetime achievement award for his work as an editor for several decades and as a consultant editor for a number of new directors and film editors
 2006: Kim Foss and Andreas Steinmann for their work with NatFilm Festival
 2007: Actress Helle Virkner, lifetime achievement award
 2008: Ib Monty, Marguerite Engberg, and Niels Jensen for their pioneering efforts for Danish film history, film studies, and film distribution
 2009: Director Jørgen Leth, lifetime achievement award for his documentary work through the ages

2010s 
 2010: Carsten Myllerup, Linda Krogsøe Holmberg, and Jens Mikkelsen for founding the alternative film school Super16
 2011: Actor Henning Moritzen, lifetime achievement award
 2012: Actress Ghita Nørby, lifetime achievement award
 2013: Composer Bent Fabricius-Bjerre, lifetime achievement award
 2014: Actor Jesper Langberg, lifetime achievement award
 2015: Danish American actor Viggo Mortensen, lifetime achievement award
 2016: Anna Karina, lifetime achievement award
 2017: , lifetime achievement award
 2018: Lone Scherfig for her impressive career as a director
 :  for his work as the head of the documentary line at the National Film School of Denmark

2020s 
 : The Danish cinemas, for their efforts after a historically difficult year of shutdown due to the covid-19 pandemic

See also 

 Robert Honorary Award

References

Sources

Further reading

External links 
  

1949 establishments in Denmark
Awards established in 1949
Honorary
Lifetime achievement awards